Rustai-ye Huruiyeh (also Romanized as Rūstāī-ye Ḩūrū’īyeh) is a village in Nowdezh Rural District, Aseminun District, Manujan County, Kerman Province, Iran. At the 2006 census, its population was 77, in 20 families.

References 

Populated places in Manujan County